The Obee House was a historic house at 1642 Green Bay Road in Highland Park, Illinois. The house was built circa 1874 for the Obee family, who owned the house for a century following its construction. The house had a vernacular clapboard form with Victorian elements. Its decorative features included a bay window and hooded window moldings. Its interior featured a wooden staircase, detailed baseboards, and pine flooring.

The house was added to the National Register of Historic Places on September 29, 1982. It was demolished in the late 1990s and replaced by a condominium development and removed from the National Register in 2020.

References

National Register of Historic Places in Lake County, Illinois
Former National Register of Historic Places in Illinois
Houses on the National Register of Historic Places in Illinois
Houses completed in 1874
Highland Park, Illinois
Demolished buildings and structures in Illinois
Buildings and structures demolished in 1998